A Comedy award can refer to numerous awards given for achievement in comedy, including:

 The Comedy Awards
 American Comedy Awards
 British Comedy Awards
 German Comedy Award
 Edinburgh Comedy Awards